Victoria Elizabeth Horner (born 11 May 1976) is a female English former competitive swimmer.

Swimming career
She represented Great Britain in the Olympic Games and European championships.  She won a bronze medal in the 4×200-metre freestyle relay at the 1995 European Aquatics Championships.  Her team finished 10th in the same event at the 1996 Summer Olympics.  She also won a silver medal in the 400-metre freestyle at the European Short Course Swimming Championships 1998. She represented England, at the 1994 Commonwealth Games in Victoria, British Columbia, Canada  and won a silver medal at the 1998 Commonwealth Games in Kuala Lumpur, Malaysia, in the 400 metres freestyle.

She is a three times winner of the British Championship in 400 metres freestyle (1997, 1998 and 2000).

Personal life
Her husband, Rob Hayles, is a retired Olympic sprint cyclist.  They have a daughter, born 23 January 2006.

References

1976 births
Living people
Swimmers at the 1996 Summer Olympics
Olympic swimmers of Great Britain
English female freestyle swimmers
English female swimmers
European Aquatics Championships medalists in swimming
Swimmers at the 1994 Commonwealth Games
Swimmers at the 1998 Commonwealth Games
Commonwealth Games medallists in swimming
Commonwealth Games silver medallists for England
Medallists at the 1998 Commonwealth Games